Zeta Doradus, Latinized from ζ Doradus, is a young star system that lies approximately 38 light-years away. The system consists of two widely separated stars, with the primary being bright enough to be observed with the naked eye but the secondary being much a much fainter star that requires telescopic equipment to be observed.

Components
Zeta Doradus A is a bright, high proper motion star with a spectral type of F7V, meaning that it is a main sequence star that is hotter and brighter than the Sun. With an apparent magnitude of 4.82, it is approximately the eighth brightest star in the constellation of Dorado.

Though it has been known that Zeta Doradus B is a nearby star since at least the Gliese Catalogue of Nearby Stars, the connection that it is a common proper motion companion to Zeta Doradus A was only made much more recently thanks to Hipparcos satellite data. The two stars form a wide binary, with a physical separation between the components of about 0.018 parsecs (0.06 light-years) which is approximately 3700 AU. This is comparable to the 15000 AU separation between Alpha Centauri AB and Proxima Centauri.

Both components of the system show considerable activity: the log R'HK of the stars are -4.373 and -4.575, respectively, whereas a star is "quiet" when it has a Log R'HK of <-4.8. This indicates that the system is young; indeed, the estimated age for Zeta Doradus A is only 0.58 billion years, about an eighth of the solar age.

It is not unusual for a young star to possess a debris disk; Zeta Doradus A is no exception, as it has been found to have an infra-red excess indicative of a disk of small bodies like comets re-emitting absorbed light at a redder wavelength. For Zeta Doradus A, the dust disk has a luminosity of 6.0 x 10−6 times the solar luminosity and a temperature of 91 ± 12 Kelvin, indicating that it lies at a separation of several AU.

Planet searches
Stars of early spectral type (>F8) are often ignored by radial velocity (RV)-based planet searches due to issues with precision: their high temperature decreases the depth of their spectral lines and they tend to be fast rotators, which broadens their spectral lines. Still, it is still sometimes possible to reach levels of precision capable of the detection of planets in AF-type stars, so Zeta Doradus A was included in a sample early-type stars observed with HARPS. The star was found to be RV-stable to 17 m/s with internal uncertainties of 3 m/s, which indicates that the star does not have any close-in high mass companions, but does not preclude the presence of sub-Jovian mass planets.

References

External links 
 
 NStars: 0505-5728

F-type main-sequence stars
Solar-type stars
K-type main-sequence stars
Binary stars
Circumstellar disks

Dorado (constellation)
Doradus, Zeta
Durchmusterung objects
0189
033262
023693
1674